The Communist Revolutionary Party (PRC) or CRP, previously known as Communistes, is a French political party officially founded in March 2002 after a split of the French Communist Party (FCP).

Its founder and first national secretary was Rolande Perlican.

History 
The Communistes organization was founded in June 2000, when a group of FCP militants of L'appel des 500 ("The Call of 500") left the party during the 30th Congress held in Martigues. Their coordinator at the time was Rolande Perlican, former senator and member of the FCP National Committee, who left the party declaring:

In March 2002, Communistes held its founding congress and defined itself as the party which would replace the FCP and as a revolutionary party. The congress elected Rolande Perlican as the National Secretary and she was reconfirmed during the 2nd, 3rd and 4th Congress in June 2004, 2006, 2008 and November 2010 respectively.

In December 2012, she was replaced by Antonio Sanchez, who would be re-elected in November 2014.

Communistes merged with the Union of Revolutionary Communists of France (Union des révolutionnaires-Communistes de France, URCF) in 2015 and became the Communist Revolutionary Party (Parti révolutionnaire Communistes, PRC). URCF regained its independence in the following year and with the Intervention Communiste collective founded Communist Revolutionary Party of France (Parti communiste révolutionnaire de France).

Ideology 
The party declares itself as a "revolutionary party of avant-garde" with Marxist-Leninist ideology. Other characteristics of the group are its self-declaration as «the only communist party in France", the denial of common actions with other communist organizations close to Marxism-Leninism and the "orthodoxy". The PRC is against every alliance with left forces which are criticized for their reformist policy supporting capitalism.

According to CRP members, the Communist Party of France has left the class struggle and has formed alliance with other left forces, the Socialist Party in particular after its participation to the programme commun and then to the second Mauroy cabinet, including their involvement into the Plural Left.

Elections 

Communistes tries to present its candidates to local and national elections, mainly in cities like Gennevilliers, Colombes, Romainville, Saint-Ouen-sur-Seine, Ivry-sur-Seine, Villejuif or Audincourt.

The party presented 21 candidates for the 2004 French cantonal elections, obtaining between the 0.71 and 5.47% of votes (an average of 1.8%). At the 2007 legislative elections, it obtained 45 seats (between 0.17 and 2.04%) and 16 at the 2008 cantonal elections (1.07- 6.08%). Communistes presented 23 candidates to the 2011 cantonal elections and took part to the 2017 legislative elections.

For the 2012 presidential election, the party presented Christophe Ricerchi as candidate.

At the 2014 European Parliament election in France, CRP proposed candidates in every electoral district of metropolitan France; however, preferences did not exceed the 0.1%.

The Parti révolutionnaire Communistes presented itself to the 2019 European Parliament election with Antonio Sanchez as front-leader, obtaining 1 413 votes corresponding to the 0.01% of preferences. It was the only list to not have the bulletin validated by the Propaganda commission, invalidating almost all the votes, unless a copy was previously deposed in every town hall.

Electoral results

European elections

See also 

 Communism
 French Communist Party
 Initiative of Communist and Workers' Parties

References

External links 
 

Political parties established in 2002
Communist parties in France